Issa Al Abbas (born 17 September 1982) is a football player .

References

External links 
 

1982 births
Living people
Khaleej FC players
Al-Taraji Club players
Saudi Arabian footballers
Saudi First Division League players
Saudi Professional League players
Saudi Second Division players
Saudi Fourth Division players
Association football fullbacks
Saudi Arabian Shia Muslims